Birame Diouf (born 2 July 1984 in Tiébissou) is an Ivorian professional footballer who currently plays as a forward for Thai League 3 side Samut Sakhon City.

References

http://th.soccerway.com/players/birame-dioue/122363/

1984 births
Living people
Ivorian footballers
Expatriate footballers in Myanmar
Expatriate footballers in Thailand
Sabé Sports players
Bireme Diouf
Bireme Diouf
Yadanarbon F.C. players
Bireme Diouf
Bireme Diouf
Bireme Diouf
Bireme Diouf
Ivorian expatriate sportspeople in Thailand
Association football forwards
Association football wingers
People from Lacs District
CO de Bamako players